The Moonlandingz are an English rock band, formed in 2015. The band consists of Eccentronic Research Council duo Adrian Flanagan and Dean Honer, along with Fat White Family members Saul Adamczewski and Lias Kaci Saoudi. The band was originally designed as a concept act for the Eccentronic Research Council's fifth album Johnny Rocket, Narcissist and Music Machine…I'm Your Biggest Fan, with the act's charismatic and otherworldly frontman Johnny Rocket being played by Saoudi.

Since the release of Johnny Rocket, Narcissist and Music Machine…I'm Your Biggest Fan in 2015, the group have continued to play live and record together, releasing two EPs under The Moonlandingz name and a full-length album - Interplanetary Class Classics in 2017.

History
The band started as a concept created by Eccentronic Research Council members Adrian Flanagan and Dean Honer, while planning the band's fourth album Johnny Rocket, Narcissist & Music Machine... I'm Your Biggest Fan. During the process, Fat White Family members Saul Adamczewski and Lias Kaci Saoudi were brought on board to conceive of a fictional band for the album. The results were a band called The Moonlandingz, led by the eponymous singer Johnny Rocket who would be voiced by Saoudi. To accompany the release of their album, The Moonlandingz EP was also released under the guise of The Moonlandingz.

After the album was released in 2015, the four collaborators decided to continue their partnership and turn the Moonlandingz concept into an actual live band. They quickly followed up by another EP - Blak Hanz, which was released on Transgressive Records in 2016.

The band released their debut album, Interplanetary Class Classics, in 2017. It was released on Transgressive Records in Europe and in the U.S. on Chimera Records. The album was created in collaboration with Sean Lennon and was recorded at his studio in New York. Former Add N to (X) drummer Ross Orton and guitarist/bassist Mairead O'Connor also recorded with the band and featured as band members on the subsequent tour.

Members
Current members
Saul Adamczewski - guitar
Adrian Flanagan - keyboards
Dean Honer - keyboards
Lias Kaci Saoudi – vocals
Mairead O'Connor - guitar

Discography

Studio albums
Interplanetary Class Classics (2017, Transgressive Records)

EPs
The Moonlandingz EP (2015, Without Consent)
Blak Hanz (2016, Transgressive Records)

References

External links
 Official website

Musical groups from Sheffield
English rock music groups
Musical groups established in 2015
2015 establishments in England